Dalcross was a railway station located at Dalcross, to the east of Inverness, Scotland (now in the Highland Council Area). It opened in 1855 and closed in 1965. A new station in Dalcross was opened on 2 February 2023.

Original station

The Inverness and Nairn Railway was formally opened on 5 November 1855, public services beginning the following day, and Dalcross was one of the four intermediate stations originally provided.

Dalcross station closed on 3 May 1965, and the signal box closed on 12 March 1967. The station building remains however and is now a private residence.

New station

A new station, Inverness Airport railway station, which is close to the site of the former Dalcross station was opened on 2 February 2023, being part of the Aberdeen–Inverness line.

Services

References

Sources

External links
RAILSCOT on Inverness and Nairn Railway
Dalcross Station on navigable 1948 O.S. map
Disused Stations - Dalcross
Inverness Airport Station & Dalcross Area Enhancements project page

Disused railway stations in Highland (council area)
Former Highland Railway stations
Railway stations in Great Britain opened in 1855
Railway stations in Great Britain closed in 1965
Beeching closures in Scotland
DfT Category F2 stations
1855 establishments in Scotland
1965 disestablishments in Scotland